Todd Dezago (born 1961) is an American comic book writer best known for his collaborations with artist Mike Wieringo on The Sensational Spider-Man and their creator-owned fantasy series Tellos.

Early life
Todd Dezago was raised in Rhinebeck, New York and studied to be an actor.

Career
Dezago began his comics writing career on X-Factor for Marvel Comics in 1994. He first worked with penciller Mike Wieringo on The Sensational Spider-Man #8 (Sept. 1996). They then worked together on the creator-owned fantasy series Tellos in 1999. The series, a coming-of-age adventure set in a magical, piratical world, ran 10 issues (May 1999–Nov. 2000). The last three issues were released by Gorilla Comics, a short-lived Image Comics imprint co-founded by Dezago and several other creators in 2000. Following the demise of the series, Dezago wrote the Tellos: Maiden Voyage #1 (March 2001) one-shot.

At DC Comics, Dezago co-created Young Justice with artist Todd Nauck in the 1998 one-shot Young Justice: The Secret. His other Young Justice work includes the 1998 miniseries JLA: World Without Grown-ups. From 1999 to 2002, he wrote Impulse #50–89. In 2005 he co-created The Perhapanauts with artist Craig Rousseau.

Bibliography

Ardden Entertainment
 Casper and the Spectrals #1–3 (2009–2010)

CD Comics
 Occupational Hazards (among others) (2000)

Dark Horse Comics
 The Perhapanauts #1–4 (2005–2006) 
 The Perhapanauts: Second Chances #1–4 (2006–2007)

DC Comics
 Batman: Gotham Knights #24 ("Batman Black and White" backup story) (2002)  
 The Flash 80-Page Giant #1 (1998)  
 Impulse #50–54, 56–59, 62–89 (1999–2002)  
 JLA 80-Page Giant #1 (1998)  
 JLA: World Without Grown-Ups #1–2 (1998)  
 Legends of the DC Universe #40–41 (2001)  
 Sins of Youth: The Secret/Deadboy #1 (2000)  
 Tangent Comics/The Flash #1 (1997)  
 Tangent Comics/The Trials of the Flash #1 (1998)  
 Teen Titans vol. 2 #50 (2007)  
 Young Justice #22 (2000)  
 Young Justice: The Secret #1 (1998)

Dynamite Entertainment
 DF Premiere: Tellos Prologue #1 (1999)
 Dynamic Forces: Tellos Preview Book #1 (1999)

Image Comics
 Monster Pile-Up #1 (2008)
 The Perhapanauts vol. 2 #1–6 (2008–2009)
The Perhapanauts Annual #1 (2008)
 The Perhapanauts: Danger Down Under #1–5 (2012–2013)
 Popgun #4 (2010)
 Section Zero #1 (Tellos backup story) (2000)
 Skullkickers #24 (2013)
 Tales of Tellos #1–3 (2004)
 Tellos #1–10 (1999–2000)
 Tellos Prelude #1 (1999)
 Tellos: The Joining #1 (1999)
 Tellos: The Last Heist #1 (2001)
 Tellos: Maiden Voyage #1 (2001)
 Tellos: Sons & Moons #1 (2002)

Marvel Comics
 The Amazing Spider-Man #404–405, 663 (1995, 2011)
 Bug #1 (1997)
 Cable vol. 2 #40–43 (1997)
 Doctor Strange, Sorcerer Supreme #83 (1995)  
 Free Comic Book Day 2010: Iron Man/Nova (backup story) (2010)
 Generation X  #11–12, 15–16 (with Scott Lobdell) (1996)
 Marvel Adventures Spider-Man #45–48 (2009)  
 Marvel Adventures Super Heroes #10 (2009)  
 Marvel Age: Spider-Man #7–11, 15, 17–18 (2004–2005) 
 Marvel Age Spider-Man Team-Up #1–5 (2004–2005)
 Marvel Super Hero Squad Online Game: Hero Up #1 (2011)    
 The Sensational Spider-Man #7–33, -1 (1996–1998)  
 The Spectacular Scarlet Spider #1–2 (1995)  
 The Spectacular Spider-Man #230–240 (1996)
 Spider-Man Family #7 (2008)  
 Spider-Man Team-Up Special #1 (2005) 
 Spider-Man: Maximum Clonage Alpha #1 (1995)  
 Spider-Man: The Clone Journal #1 (1995)  
 Spider-Man: The Jackal Files #1 (1995)  
 Strong Guy Reborn #1 (1997)   
 The Thing/She-Hulk: The Long Night #1 (2002)
 Web of Scarlet Spider #1–2  (1995)
 Web of Spider-Man #121–122, 126–129 (1995)
 What If...? #90 (1996)
 Wolverine #129–131 (1998)
 Wolverine: Killing Made Simple #1 (2008)
 X-Factor #103–111 (1994–1995)  
 X-Force and Cable '95 #1 (1995)  
 X-Men #½ (1998) 
 X-Men Unlimited #21 (1998)

Selfpublished
The Mike Wieringo Tellos Tribute Vol.1–2 (2017)
The Perhapanauts: Into Hollow Earth OGN (2016)

Sitcomics
 Startup Binge Book #3 (with Darin Henry) (2020)

References

Further reading
 First Class Comic Review #2, 2010 by Lily and Ellie Egleton.

External links
 
 Todd Dezago at Mike's Amazing World of Comics
 Todd Dezago at the Unofficial Handbook of Marvel Comics Creators

1961 births
American comics writers
Living people
People from Rhinebeck, New York